Every Picture Tells a Story is the third studio album by Rod Stewart. It was released on 28 May 1971. It incorporates hard rock, folk, and blues styles. It went to number one on both the UK and US charts and finished third in the Jazz & Pop critics' poll for best album of 1971. It has been an enduring critical success, including a number 172 ranking on Rolling Stones 2003 list of the 500 greatest albums of all time.

History
This album is a mixture of rock, country, blues, soul, and folk, and includes Stewart's breakthrough hit, "Maggie May", as well as "Reason to Believe", a song from Tim Hardin's debut album of 1966. "Reason to Believe", with Pete Sears on piano, was released as the first single from the album with "Maggie May" as the B-side; however, "Maggie May" became more popular and was a No. 1 hit in both the UK and US.

The album includes a version of Arthur Crudup's "That's All Right (Mama)" (the first single for Elvis Presley) and a cover of the Bob Dylan song "Tomorrow Is a Long Time," an outtake from Dylan's 1963 album The Freewheelin' Bob Dylan (it would see release on 1971's Bob Dylan's Greatest Hits Vol. II).

All five members of the Faces (with whom Stewart at that time was lead vocalist) appear on the album, with guitarist/bassist Ronnie Wood and keyboardist Ian McLagan on Hammond B3 organ being employed most. Due to contractual restrictions, the personnel listings were somewhat vague, and it was unclear that the full Faces line-up recorded the version of the Motown hit "(I Know) I'm Losing You". Other contributors included Ray Jackson on mandolin (though Stewart allegedly forgot his name and merely mentioned "the mandolin player in Lindisfarne" on the sleeve) and Micky Waller on drums. Maggie Bell performed backing vocals (mentioned on the sleeve as "vocal abrasives") on the title track, and Madeline Bell sang backup on the next track, "Seems Like A Long Time". Pete Sears played all the piano on the album except for one track, "I'm Losing You", which had Ian McLagan on piano, along with the Faces as a band.

The album reached the number-one position in both the UK (for six weeks) and the US (four weeks) at the same time that "Maggie May" was topping the singles charts in both territories.

The Temptations cover, "I Know I'm Losing You" reached the top 40 at No. 24 on the Billboard Hot 100 in the US.

Reception 

In his original Rolling Stone review, John Mendelsohn wrote: "Boring as half of it may be, there's enough that is unqualifiedly magnificent on the other half." However, Village Voice critic Robert Christgau gave the album a glowing review, writing: "Rod the Wordslinger is a lot more literate than the typical English bloozeman, Rod the Singer can make words flesh, and though Rod the Bandleader's music is literally electric it's the mandolin and pedal steel that come through sharpest."

Legacy
The album has been an enduring critical success, including a number 172 ranking on Rolling Stones 2003 list of the 500 greatest albums of all time, maintaining the rating in a 2012 revised list, dropping slightly in a 2020 revised list to number 177. In 1992, the album was awarded the number-one spot in Jimmy Guterman's book The Best Rock 'N' Roll Records of All Time: A Fan's Guide to the Stuff You Love. It was ranked 99th in a 2005 survey held by British television's Channel 4 to determine the 100 greatest albums of all time.

In a retrospective review for AllMusic, Stephen Thomas Erlewine wrote: "Without greatly altering his approach, Rod Stewart perfected his blend of hard rock, folk, and blues on his masterpiece, Every Picture Tells a Story."

Track listing

Notes
"Henry" was only printed on the label of the original British and international releases, not on the sleeve. It was omitted in the track listing of some CD versions, as in some pressings of the album and most Stewart compilations, the "Henry" intro is incorporated into the full "Maggie May" track.
"Amazing Grace" is not listed on the label on most editions, and on some CDs is part of "That's All Right". The words were written by John Newton.

Personnel
 Rod Stewart – lead vocals, acoustic guitar
 Ronnie Wood – guitar, pedal steel guitar, bass guitar
 Martin Quittenton – acoustic guitar
 Ray Jackson ("the mandolin player in Lindisfarne") – mandolin
 Sam Mitchell – slide guitar
 Andy Pyle – bass guitar
 Ronnie Lane – bass guitar and backing vocals on "(I Know) I'm Losing You" (uncredited)
 Danny Thompson – upright bass
 Dick Powell – violin
 Ian McLagan – Hammond organ, piano on "(I Know) I'm Losing You"
 Pete Sears – piano, celeste
 Long John Baldry – vocals on "Every Picture Tells a Story"
 Maggie Bell – "vocal abrasives" on "Every Picture Tells a Story"
 Madeline Bell and friends – "vocal abrasives" on "Seems Like a Long Time"
 Micky Waller – drums
 Kenney Jones – drums on "(I Know) I'm Losing You" (uncredited)

On the album's liner notes, the names of two alcoholic beverages (Martell Cognac and Mateus Rosé) are interspersed amongst the personnel credits.

Technical
 Desmond Strobel – art direction
 John Craig – design, illustration 
 Lisa Margolis – front cover photo
 Aaron Sixx – back cover photo

Charts

Weekly charts

Year-end charts

Certifications

References

 A.V. Club Permanent Records review

1971 albums
Rod Stewart albums
Mercury Records albums
Albums produced by Rod Stewart
Albums recorded at Morgan Sound Studios